KEZO-FM (92.3 FM) is a commercial radio station in Omaha, Nebraska. It is owned by SummitMedia.  KEZO airs an active rock radio format. KEZO's studios are located on Mercy Road in Omaha's Aksarben Village, and the station's transmitter is off North 72nd Street and Crown Point at the Omaha master antenna farm.

Todd-n-Tyler (Mike Tyler and Todd Brandt) host the station's morning show, with the program syndicated to other radio stations. KEZO broadcasts highlights from Todd-n-Tyler on its HD Radio digital audio subchannel.

History

Top 40 (1961-197?) 
On May 15, 1961, the station signed on as WOW-FM, a sister station to 590 WOW (now KXSP).

Beautiful music (197?-197?) 
After initially simulcasting the AM station, it switched to broadcasting beautiful music.

Top 40 (197?-197?) 
It became a Top 40 station for a short time in the early 1970s under the call letters KFMX.

Easy listening (197?-1978) 
Then it switched back to easy listening music, and, in 1973, changed its call letters to KEZO, standing for EaZy Omaha.

Rock (1978-present) 
The station flipped to rock music at 9 a.m. on September 6, 1978, still keeping its KEZO call letters but using the identification Z-92.

Notable former Z-92 announcers include Otis XII of the group Ogden Edsl and his long-time partner Diver Dan Doomey.  A popular long-running feature of their morning show was Space Commander Wack, produced by Ralph Caldwell who was also the voice of announcer Yerzik Narge. Other recurring characters included the Mean Farmer and Lance Stallion, Radio Detective. Some notable DJs include Chuck Yates, Joe Blood, Rick Setchell, and Tim Bourke.

Journal Communications and the E. W. Scripps Company announced on July 30, 2014 that the two companies would merge to create a new media company under the E.W. Scripps Company name that would own the two companies' broadcast properties, including KEZO-FM. The transaction was completed in 2015. Scripps exited radio in 2018; the Omaha stations went to SummitMedia in a four-market, $47 million deal completed on November 1, 2018.

References

External links
Z92 (official website)
Todd-n-Tyler (official site)
Todd and Tyler Unauthorized

EZO-FM
Active rock radio stations in the United States
Radio stations established in 1961
1961 establishments in Nebraska